Boettcheria is a genus of flesh flies in the family Sarcophagidae. There are at least 20 described species in Boettcheria.

Species
These 28 species belong to the genus Boettcheria:

B. arnaudi Lopes, 1950 c g
B. aurifera Lopes, 1950 c g
B. bisetosa Parker, 1914 i c g b
B. calceata (Dodge, 1967) c g
B. cimbicis (Townsend, 1892)
B. cubana Lopes, 1950 i c g
B. dentata Dodge, 1966 c g
B. elegans Lopes, 1975 c g
B. holmani Rohdendorf, 1971 c g
B. latisterna Parker, 1914 i c g
B. litorosa (Reinhard, 1947) i c g
B. maerens (Townsend, 1916) c g
B. marstoni Dodge, 1966 c g
B. melanderi Dodge, 1967 i c g
B. mexicana Lopes, 1950 c g
B. mundelli Blanchard, 1939 c g
B. parkeri (Aldrich, 1916) c g
B. parkeriana Lopes, 1976 c g
B. peruviana Lopes, 1950 c g
B. petersoni Lopes, 1988 c g
B. praevolans (Wulp, 1896) i c g
B. pugetensis Dodge, 1967 i c g
B. pyrrhopyga (Hall, 1933) c g
B. retroversa (Lopes, 1935) c g
B. similis Lopes, 1946 c g
B. solo Pape, 1989 c g
B. styx Pape & Dahlem, 1998 c g
B. taurus (Aldrich, 1916) c g

Data sources: i = ITIS, c = Catalogue of Life, g = GBIF, b = Bugguide.net

References

Further reading

 

Sarcophagidae
Articles created by Qbugbot
Oestroidea genera